Paul Stewart McLennan is a Scottish National Party (SNP) politician who has been the Member of the Scottish Parliament (MSP) for East Lothian since 2021.

He has served as a local councillor for the Dunbar and East Linton multi-member ward of East Lothian Council since 2007 having previously been an unsuccessful candidate in earlier elections to single-member wards, and was both the SNP group leader and the council leader from 2007 to 2012. He has been a board member of NHS Lothian, the regional offices of Scottish Enterprise and the Commission on School Reform.

McLennan is East Lothian's first SNP MSP, with the constituency having been previously held by Scottish Labour since 1999.

References

External links 
 

Year of birth missing (living people)
Living people
Scottish National Party MSPs
Members of the Scottish Parliament 2021–2026
People associated with East Lothian
Scottish National Party councillors
Scottish republicans